Teresa De Sio (born 3 November 1952) is an Italian pop-folk singer and songwriter. She is the elder sister of actress Giuliana De Sio.

Biography and career
Teresa De Sio was born in Naples and grew up in Cava de' Tirreni, where her family was originally from. In 1976 she started her career as a vocalist with Eugenio Bennato and Musicanova, a group which focused on Neapolitan folk music.

In 1980 she launched her solo career with the album (Sulla terra sulla luna). Her second album Teresa De Sio, sung in Neapolitan, was met with critical and commercial success and sold over  500,000 copies in italy. Her third album Tre (1982), sold over 500,000 copies and reinforced her status as one of Italy's most promising talents; some of her well-known songs from this period include Voglia 'e turnà, Aumm aumm, 'E pazzielle, Terra 'e nisciuno and Ario'.

De Sio collaborated with Brian Eno for her next two albums, Africana (1985) and Sindarella suite (1988). In the 1990s her work became more politically engaged. In her 1995 album Un libero cercare she worked with Fabrizio De André and Fiorella Mannoia.

In 2003 performed, along with Stewart Copeland and Vittorio Cosma at "La Notte della Taranta" in Melpignano. In 2005 De Sio participated to the 62nd edition with the documentary Craj  The film was directed by Davide Marengo, and went on to win the Lino Micciché Prize.

Discography

Solo albums 

 1978 – Villanelle Popolaresche del '500
 1980 – Sulla terra sulla luna
 1982 – Teresa De Sio
 1983 – Tre
 1985 – Africana
 1986 – Toledo e regina
 1988 – Sindarella suite
 1991 – Ombre rosse
 1993 – La mappa del nuovo mondo
 1995 – Un libero cercare
 1997 – Primo viene l'amore
 1999 – La notte del Dio che balla
 2004 – A Sud! A Sud!
 2007 – Sacco e fuoco
 2011 - Tutto cambia

Compilation albums 
 1991 – Voglia 'e turnà
 1998 – Successi
 2002 – Voglia 'e turnà e altri successi
 2006 – Primo viene l'amore: Le più belle canzoni di Teresa De Sio
 2012 – Primo viene l'amore: Mediterranea

Singles 
 1995 - "Animali Italiani"
 2011 - "Inno Nazionale" / "Non Dormo Mai Tutta La Notte" / "Padroni E Bestie"

Notes

References

External links

 
 Teresa De Sio official site

1955 births
Living people
Italian singer-songwriters
Italian folk singers
People from Cava de' Tirreni
Italian-language singers